Tomov or Tomow is a Bulgarian masculine surname, its feminine counterpart is Tomova or Tomowa. Notable people with the surname include:

Aleksandar Tomov (wrestler) (born 1949), Bulgarian wrestler
Aleksandar Tomov (politician) (born 1954), Bulgarian politician, economist and academic
Anna Tomowa-Sintow (born 1941), Bulgarian soprano singer
Blagica Pop Tomova (born 1977), operatic soprano of Bulgarian background from the former Yugoslavia
Lilyana Tomova (born 1946), Bulgarian sprinter 
Radina Tomova (born 2005), Bulgarian rhythmic gymnast 
Toma Tomov (born 1958), Bulgarian hurdler
Valentin Tomov (born 1996), Bulgarian football player
Viktoriya Tomova (born 1995), Bulgarian tennis player
Yordan Tomov (1924–1998), Bulgarian football player and coach

Bulgarian-language surnames